The R317 is a Regional Route in South Africa that connects Bredasdorp in the south with Robertson in the north via Bonnievale.

Its northerly origin in Robertson is from the R60. It leaves the town heading east, but veers south. It bypasses Bonnievale to the east, and then crosses the N2 at a staggered interchange. After this it meets the R316 and R319 at Bredasdorp.

When surfacing and upgrading of the Gansbaai–Elim–Bredasdorp road is complete the R317 numbering will be extended along this road.

External links
 Routes Travel Info

References

Regional Routes in the Western Cape